Occult blood may refer to:

Fecal occult blood, blood present in the feces that is not visibly apparent
Hematuria, the presence of red blood cells in the urine